FIU Panthers football program represents Florida International University (FIU) in the sport of American football. The Panthers compete in the Football Bowl Subdivision (FBS) of the National Collegiate Athletic Association (NCAA) and the East Division of Conference USA (CUSA). The Panthers' head coach is Mike MacIntyre. FIU has produced a Sun Belt Conference co-championship team in 2010, along with 3 postseason bowl appearances. The Panthers play their home games at Riccardo Silva Stadium which has a seating capacity of 20,000.

History

Don Strock era (2002–2006)

On 1 September 1999, after several years of contemplating the commencement of a football team, FIU moved a step closer by hiring Don Strock to be FIU's Director of Football Operations. One year later, Don Strock was named head coach with plans to lay the foundations for a college football team. Quarterback David Tabor was the first FIU football recruit. In February 2002, FIU found its star quarterback in high school, Jamie Burke from Cardinal Mooney High, Sarasota, Florida. Burke was the only player to ever throw for over 500 yards in a single game in Florida as well as led the state in touchdown passes in a season with 34. Burke was being recruited by the University of Florida but opted for FIU when Steve Spurrier left to coach the Washington Redskins. FIU had everything it needed to begin competing in NCAA Football. FIU was placed in the Division I-AA level as an Independent team.

FIU won its inaugural game on August 29, 2002 against Saint Peter's College (New Jersey), 27–3. The team played fairly well against the competition that season and managed to finish with a 5–6 record. The Golden Panthers then hoped to build on that in the coming 2003 season. FIU signed to play more challenging teams of the division in hopes to get more recognition as a solid football team. The opening game of the following season started with a loss to Indiana State, and it led to a 0–8 start for the second-year team. They failed to reach the standard set the season before and fell to a 2–10 season. The next season followed with similar results, finishing with a 3–7 record.

After the 2004 season, FIU moved up to Division I FBS, formerly known as Division I-A, despite their relative lack of success in their first three seasons in Division I FCS. FIU became the fastest school in the history of college football to reach the highest level.  This has since been eclipsed by multiple schools during the conference movement in 2012.

The Panthers moved to Division I-A in 2005. Many of the season's players were from the 2003 recruiting class. Keyonvis Bouie, FIU's linebacker recorded 118 tackles in nine games, 11 for a loss and three interceptions. A second linebacker, Antwan Barnes recorded 15 tackles for a loss and added 11 sacks to his statistics. On offense, FIU's quarterback, Josh Padrick who passed for 2743 yards and 13 touchdowns. His primary target was Chandler Williams, who caught 61 passes for a total of 870 yards. It was these defensive performances that allowed FIU to compete with the teams in Division I-A and finish the season 5–6.

FIU had found the foundation upon which the team would be built. As characteristic of FIU's athletic department, the following year, FIU signed to play harder teams. FIU was headed in the right direction but still lacked consistency, and organization. As they began their 2006 season they almost evenly matched the teams which they played, losing almost all of their first few games by very narrow margins: Middle Tennessee 7–6, USF 21–20, Bowling Green 33–28, Maryland 14–10, and University of North Texas 22–25 (7OTs).

On October 14, 2006, FIU and the Miami Hurricanes met for the first time in what was supposed to be the beginning of an annual cross-town rivalry game. Nine minutes into the second half the two teams engaged in a brawl involving players from both schools, including one injured FIU player on crutches and one UM player using his helmet as a weapon. The violence later spilled into the stands, where several spectators were arrested and later released without charges. 31 players were later punished for the incident, including 13 Miami players and 18 FIU players. Two FIU players were kicked off the team.

The FIU defense still finished 28th nationally, and 4th in pass defense. Antwan Barnes ranked 3rd in the nation in tackles for loss with 22 and 6 sacks. Bouie gained 119 tackles 18 for loss, and Alexander Bostic would add 98 tackles, 19 for loss and 8 sacks. Barnes, Bouie and, Bostic came to be known as the "Killer B's". On offense, FIU's receiver Chandler Williams, caught 67 passes for 664 yards.

Mario Cristobal era (2007–2012)
In 2006, Barnes and Williams were both drafted to the NFL. That same year, the FIU Athletics Department hired a new athletic director Pete Garcia, and found a new head coach for the team, Mario Cristobal. Cristobal became the second youngest Division I-A coach at 37. Cristobal brought in a new coaching staff in hopes to turn the program around.

In 2007, FIU was the second-youngest team in Division I-A. 2/3 were underclassmen, mostly freshmen. During the 2007 season, FIU played its home games in the Miami Orange Bowl during the expansion of Riccardo Silva Stadium to 20,000 seats. The Golden Panthers concluded the season with a win against North Texas 38–19. It was the last college football game ever played at the historic Orange Bowl prior to its demolition and the last home win at that stadium. In September 2008, the Panthers inaugurated the expanded Riccardo Silva Stadium by hosting the South Florida Bulls with a crowd of over 16,000. FIU lost the game 17–9. The team would go on to win the next three games in a showing of a much improved team from the 2006 and 2007 team.

On Saturday, November 27, 2010, FIU defeated Arkansas State to clinch the Sun Belt Conference Title. This earned FIU its first bowl berth in the short history of its football program. Twenty-nine days later, on December 26, they became Little Caesars Champions. Fans brought signs saying, "¡Sí se puede!", Spanish for "Yes we can!" On December 3, 2011, FIU accepted an invitation to play in the 2011 Beef 'O' Brady's Bowl, the school's second consecutive bowl game.

After going from an 8–5 season in 2011 to a 3–9 season in 2012, FIU Athletic Director Pete Garcia made the decision to fire Cristobal because "we’ve gone backwards over the last year and a half. Over the last 22 games, we've gone 11–14." Garcia openly coveted Butch Davis to replace Cristobal. The decision was heavily criticized.

Ron Turner era (2013–2016)
On January 3, 2013, FIU hired Ron Turner, former head coach at San Jose State and Illinois, as the program's third head coach. The Panthers failed to make a bowl game appearance during his tenure, posting a 1–11 record in 2013 followed by a 4–8 record in 2014 and a 5–7 record in 2015. After FIU suffered an 0–4 start to the 2016 campaign including blowout losses to Maryland and in-state rival UCF, Turner was fired on September 25, 2016. Ron Cooper replaced him as an interim head coach until the end of the season.

Butch Davis era (2017–2021)
On November 15, 2016, former Miami and North Carolina head coach Butch Davis, who was serving as a college football analyst at ESPN at the time, was named the fifth head coach of the Panthers. Coach Davis  led the Panthers to three consecutive seasons of bowl eligibility.  Notably, on November 23, 2019, FIU defeated the Miami Hurricanes by a score of 30–24, with FIU quarterback James Morgan throwing for two touchdown passes in the upset of their crosstown rival. However, after going a combined 1–16 in 2020 and 2021, FIU declined to renew Davis after 2021, ending his 5-year tenure.

Mike MacIntyre era (2022–present)
On December 9, 2021, Memphis defensive coordinator Mike MacIntyre, formerly head coach at San Jose State and Colorado, was named the 6th head coach of the program.

Conference affiliations

 Independent (2002–2004)
 Sun Belt Conference (2005–2012) 
 Conference USA (2013–present)

Conference championships 
FIU has won one conference championship.

† Co-champions

Bowl games

FIU has played in five bowl games, compiling a record of 2–3.

Head coaches
There have been 5 different head coaching tenures at FIU.

† 10 wins later vacated due to NCAA sanctions, 15–41 record on-field.

‡  Interim head coach

Rivalries

Florida Atlantic

The Shula Bowl is the rivalry game against Florida Atlantic. It was first played in 2002, and has been played every year since then. The winner receives the Don Shula Award.  The game and trophy are named after former Miami Dolphins head coach, Don Shula. The game is typically either in Boca Raton at Florida Atlantic University or University Park at Florida International University, though there have been meetings in other locations in the Miami metropolitan area.  In total the two squads have met 17 times with Florida Atlantic holding a 13–4 lead as of the 2019 season conclusion. The 2005 game does not count with FIU having to vacate their victory due to NCAA violations and penalties.

Future non-conference opponents
Announced schedules as of September 26, 2022.

Bibliography
ESPN College Football Encyclopedia: The Complete history of the Game

References

External links 

 

 
American football teams established in 2002
2002 establishments in Florida